The 280th Infantry Division was an infantry division of the German Heer during World War II. Initially, the deployment of the 280th Infantry Division was ordered in May 1940, but aborted in June of that same year. The division was deployed a second time in 1942 and served in occupied Norway until 1945.

History

First deployment, 1940 
On 22 May 1940, the divisions of the tenth Aufstellungswelle, including the 280th Infantry Division, were ordered to deploy by 1 July in anticipation of a prolonged campaign in the west. However, as France agreed to an armistice on 22 June, the divisions of the tenth wave were no longer necessary, and their deployment was aborted. The regiments initially intended for the 280th Infantry Division, the Infantry Regiments 556, 557, and 558, as well as the Artillery Detachment 280, returned to their reserve formations.

Second deployment, 1942 – 1945 
Another division named 280th Infantry Division was deployed on 22 April 1942 in the west of occupied Norway, in the Stavanger sector. The initial commander of the 280th Infantry Division was Karl Beeren, appointed on 27 April 1942.

The division was poorly equipped throughout its history; it had no reconnaissance, Panzerjäger, or field replacement formations, and its artillery consisted of four captured French 100mm guns.

In September 1943, the 280th Infantry Division consisted of the following elements:

 Fortress Battalion 655
 Fortress Battalion 657
 Fortress Battalion 666

In September 1944, the divisional headquarters were moved from Stavanger to Bergen.

On 10 November 1944, Beeren was replaced as divisional commander by Johann de Boer.

In early 1945, the 280th Infantry Division consisted of the following elements:

 Battalion 645
 Battalion 655
 Battalion 658
 Battalion 666
 Battalion 1015
 Fortress Battalion "A"
 Signal Company 280
 Supply Troops 280
 Panzer Company Bergen

On 9 May 1945, the day after German surrender, the division capitulated not having had seen any major combat between 1942 and 1945.

Superior formations

Noteworthy individuals 

 Karl Beeren, divisional commander between 27 April 1942 and 10 November 1944.
 Johann de Boer, divisional commander between 10 November 1944 and 9 May 1945.

References 

Infantry divisions of Germany during World War II
Military units and formations established in 1940
Military units and formations disestablished in 1940
Military units and formations established in 1942
Military units and formations disestablished in 1945